Huitang is a rural town in Ningxiang City, Hunan Province, China. It is surrounded by Fengmuqiao Township on the northwest, Xieleqiao Town on the northeast, and Jinsou Township on the south.

History
Fengmuqiao township and Xieleqiao town merged to Huitang town on November 19, 2015.

Administrative division
The town is divided into 16 villages and two communities: 
 Tangquan Community
 Xie Community
 Ningnan
 Shuangjian
 Huitang
 Jinnong
 Jiangjun
 Zhitian
 Shuangpen
 Bashi
 Xing()
 Dongting
 Xinfeng
 Yongxing
 Niujiaowan
 Gunanqiao
 Huaguoshan
 Fengmuqiao

Geography
The Wu River, a tributary of the Wei River, flows through the town.

Dongting Reservoir is the largest reservoir and largest water body in the town.

Culture
Huaguxi is the most influential local theater.

Transportation

Expressway
The Changsha-Shaoshan-Loudi Expressway, which runs east through Jinshi Town, Donghutang Town, Huaminglou Town, and Daolin Town to Yuelu District, Changsha, and the west through Jinsou Township, Yueshan Town, Hutian Town to Louxing District, Loudi.

Attractions
Huitang Hot Spring and Peace Valley of Mount Dongwu are scenic spots in the town.

Gallery

References

External links

Divisions of Ningxiang
Ningxiang